Neurabin-2 is a protein that in humans is encoded by the PPP1R9B gene.

Spinophilin is a regulatory subunit of protein phosphatase-1 catalytic subunit (PP1; see MIM 176875) and is highly enriched in dendritic spines, specialized protrusions from dendritic shafts that receive most of the excitatory input in the central nervous system (Allen et al., 1997).[supplied by OMIM]

Interactions
PPP1R9B has been shown to interact with PPP1CB, PPP1CA, Dopamine receptor D2, P16, PPP1CC, T-cell lymphoma invasion and metastasis-inducing protein 1 and PPP1R2.

References

Further reading